Weißgerber or Weissgerber is a German language occupational surname for a tanner and may refer to:
Andreas Weißgerber (1900–1941), Austrian-Hungarian violinist
Josip Weissgerber (1922–1985), Croatian Jesuit, philosopher, writer and missionary
Katharine Weißgerber (1818–1886),  German humanitarian
Leo Weissgerber (1899–1985), German linguist
Tycho Weißgerber (1952), German fencer

References 

German-language surnames
Occupational surnames